Nykarleby is a town and municipality of Finland. It is located in the Ostrobothnia region. The municipality is bilingual, with the majority speaking Swedish and the minority Finnish.

The largest employers in the town are Prevex (member of KWH Group), a packaging and piping products manufacturer, Westwood, which manufactures wooden staircases, and in the village of Jeppo, KWH Mirka, a coated abrasives manufacturer. A Swedish-speaking art school is located in Nykarleby town.

History
The town is located at the mouth of the Lapua river. The name of the place was Lapuan Joensuu or "mouth of Lapua river". The municipality was founded in 1607 by merging parts of Pedersöre and Vörå into a new parish. In 1620, the small village of Lepua was chartered as a city, with the Swedish name Nykarleby, which means "New Karleby", and the Finnish name is a Finnicized version of the same. The town was chartered in the same year as the nearby city of Kokkola, or in Swedish, Gamlakarleby (later, Karleby).

The battles of Nykarleby and Jutas were fought there between Swedish and Russian troops during the Finnish War in 1808.

Zacharias Topelius, an important author in Finland, was born in Nykarleby.

In 1995, the small, idyllic town was ranked as "the happiest city in Finland" in a controversial article in Helsingin Sanomat, the leading newspaper of Finland. Nykarleby has the highest concentration of Ukrainian speakers in Finland.

Politics
Results of the 2011 Finnish parliamentary election in Nykarleby:

Swedish People's Party 63.8%
Social Democratic Party 24.9%
Christian Democrats 4.6%
True Finns 2.0%
Centre Party 1.6%
Left Alliance 1.5%
National Coalition Party 0.7%
Green League 0.6%

Notable people 
List of notable people that were born in, or have lived in, Nykarleby.
 Zacharias Topelius, (1818–1898) author
 Erik Bergman, (1911–2006), composer
 Gösta Ågren, (1936–2020) poet and director
 Leo Komarov, (born 1987) ice hockey player
 Sandra Eriksson, (born 1989) a middle distance runner
 Rory Penttinen, (born 1979) racing driver

International relations

Twin towns – Sister cities
Nykarleby is twinned with:

 Hammel, Denmark  
 Steinkjer, Norway 
 Sollefteå, Sweden

See also
 Finnish national road 8
 Finnish national road 19

References

External links

 Town of Nykarleby – Official website
 A comprehensive collection of stories and pictures from Nykarleby's history 

 
Grand Duchy of Finland
Cities and towns in Finland
Populated coastal places in Finland
1620 establishments in Sweden